The London Sessions is the sixth studio album by Dutch DJ and record producer Tiësto. It was released on 15 May 2020 by Musical Freedom, PM:AM Recordings and Universal Music. The album features three collaborations, with Canadian producers Dzeko and Shaun Frank, and British producer Jonas Blue, as well as uncredited collaborations with Luis Torres, Gorgon City and Burns.

Background and release
Tiësto said about the album:

Track listing
The track listing was revealed on social media on 7 May 2020.

Notes
  signifies a co-producer
  signifies an additional producer
  signifies a vocal producer

Personnel and credits
Producers

Tiësto
Sergio Popken
Luis Torres
Goldfingers
Josh Wilkinson
Gorgon City
Deputy
Jonas Blue
Stonebank
Dzeko
Preme
Wallis Lane
Max Motif
Ely Rise
Shaun Frank
Yaakov Gruzman
AJ Healy
Stuart Crichton
Lauren Christy
Joe Walter
Burns
Luke Storrs

Charts

References

2020 albums
Tiësto albums
Universal Music Group albums